Bizana is a town in the Eastern Cape province of South Africa. It is the seat of the Winnie Madikizela-Mandela Local Municipality.

Winnie Mandela, ex-wife of Nelson Mandela, was born here in 1936. Oliver Reginald Tambo (popularly known as OR Tambo which the international airport in Johannesburg is named after) was also born and grew up in this town. The town has many surrounding villages. Bizana has a provincial hospital, named St Patrick's Hospital. There is also a hospital called Greenville hospital in the eTyeni area of Imizizi Administrative area.

Entertainment and nature

The Wild Coast Sun casino and hotel by Sun international group is in the Bizana District, situated 56,6 kilometres  from the town. The Wild Coast Sun has hosted Idols SA theatre week in 2016 and 2017. Bizana is in the Wild coast area and has beautiful beaches. One of them is silver beach where the hotel complex is located and a very beautiful and peaceful beach in the Xholobeni area. Xholobeni is also endowed with some mineral resources hence the recent fights about possible mining in the area which has led to court cases between the people and the government, as the Bizana community doesn't want their land to be touched and be left in ruins.

Bizana is on the border between Kwa-Zulu Natal and Eastern cape province. The predominant race group is the Xhosa people like the rest of the Eastern Cape province as it is the homeland of the Xhosa people.

Education
Bizana has many primary and secondary schools to serve the community. Mr Clement Sandile Nteta, who is one of the unsung heroes of the struggle for liberation was a key incognito ANC operative. Nteta clandestinely ensured a safe passage for many of the ANC stalwarts into exile. During the periods of the 1970s and 1980s Clement Nteta continued his fight against apartheid by creating and instilling a culture of education in the region. He was instrumental in developing schools and an education system which delivered quality education to learners. Many of his students are prominent members of government as a consequence of the foundation he built. He was the Chairman of the Retired Teachers Association at the time of his death in 2017. He was leading the fight for teachers to be paid for their years of service and pensions they have not received since retirement.

1986 bombing
On 18 April 1986, two people were killed and several others injured when a bomb, set up by Phumzile Mayaphi, exploded at the Wild Coast Casino near Bizana. Mayaphi was charged and convicted of murder and sabotage, and was sentenced to death on 12 May 1989. The African National Congress denied responsibility for the attack.

Culture
 Mbizana  Cultural Village

Notable people
 Babalo Madikizela - Eastern Cape MEC for Public Works
Winnie Madikizela-Mandela - Anti-Apartheid Movement activist, president of the African National Congress Women's League & former wife of Nelson Mandela
Oliver Tambo - Anti-Apartheid Movement activist & President of the African National Congress
 Siphosakhe Ntiya-Ntiya - footballer

References

External links

Populated places in the Mbizana Local Municipality